HMS Panther was a 60-gun fourth-rate ship of the line of the Royal Navy, launched on 22 June 1758 at Chatham Dockyard.

She served during the Seven Years' War, sailing for the far east to take part in the expedition against Manila. On 31 October 1761 Panther and the  24-gun sixth-rate  captured the Spanish galleon  in a two-hour action, loaded with cargo valued at $1.5 million.

Panther was fitted as a prison hulk at Plymouth Dockyard from 1807, and was broken up in 1813.

Notes

References

External links
 

Ships built in Chatham
Edgar-class ships of the line
1758 ships